Bubullimë is a village and a former municipality in the Fier County, western Albania. At the 2015 local government reform it became a subdivision of the municipality Lushnjë. The population at the 2011 census was 5,548.

Notable people 
Methodius (Berat), Berat's archbishop, who in 1743 started renovations of the Ardenica Monastery.

References 

Former municipalities in Fier County
Administrative units of Lushnjë
Villages in Fier County